Polytechnic University of the Philippines, Santa Maria, Bulacan Campus or PUP-SMBC is a PUP extension campus in Sitio Gulod, Brgy. Pulong-Buhangin, municipality of Santa Maria, Bulacan province, Philippines, offering undergraduate programs.

The extension was created through a Memorandum of Agreement between the university and the Santa Maria Municipality government. Professor Emilia C. Mateo, MAT, MBE served as the extension's first directress, followed by Prof. Arlene R. Queri then Prof. Orlando Batongbakal (as OIC), Engr. Aureluz L. Torres, Prof. Kathryn Placido (as Acting Director), Lualhati dela Cruz, Prof. Jose M. Abat and Prof. Ricardo F. Ramiscal took the position followed by Prof. Artemus G. Cruz, Dr. Marissa Baybay and the current director is Prof. Len Isip.

Last September 2018, PUP Santa Maria Bulacan Campus celebrated its 13th Founding Anniversary.

Courses

College of Accountancy (COA)
 Bachelor of Science in Accountancy (BSA)

College of Business (CB)
 Bachelor of Science in Entrepreneurship (BSEntrep)

College of Engineering (CE)
 Bachelor of Science in Civil Engineering (BSCE)
 Bachelor of Science in Computer Engineering (BSCpe)

College of Education (COED)
 Bachelor in Secondary Education Major in English (BSEd-English)
 Bachelor in Secondary Education Major in Mathematics (BSEd-Math)

College of Computer Management and Information Technology (CCMIT)
 Bachelor of Science in Information Technology (BSIT)

College of Tourism and Hotel and Restaurant Management (CTHRM)
 Bachelor of Science in Hospitality Management (BSHM)

College of Technology (CT)
 Diploma in Office Management Technology (DOMT)

University Organizations

 PUP Santa Maria Bulacan Student Council
 Junior Philippine Institute of Accountants
 Philippine Institute of Civil Engineering PUP SMB Chapter
 Association of Future Teachers
 Alliance of Computer Engineering Students
 Chambers of Entrepreneurs and Managers
 Hospitality Management Society
 Integrated Students of Information Technology 
 Office Management Technology Sy-Quest

External links 
 Polytechnic University of the Philippines – Official website

Polytechnic University of the Philippines
Universities and colleges in Bulacan
Education in Santa Maria, Bulacan